William A. Lewis (born April 18, 1971), professionally known as Spliff Star, is an American rapper and record producer from Flatbush, Brooklyn, New York. He's best known for his work with Busta Rhymes. Both Vibe and Complex listed Spliff Star as one of the best hype men in hip hop.

He is a former member of the Flipmode Squad. He co-founded his own label, PaperRock Records in 2007, and released his first solo effort in 2008. He has 3 children. Elijah, Leilani, and Brooklyn.

Discography

Studio albums 
 1998 - The Imperial (with Flipmode Squad) (Flipmode Records/Elektra Records)
 2008 - Contraband (PaperRock Records/Conglomerate Records)

Guest appearances

Filmography 
2000 - Da Hip Hop Witch (as himself)
2007 - Rap Sheet: Hip-Hop and The Cops (as himself)

References

External links 
Spliff Star
Getty Images : Spliff Star

1975 births
Living people
Rappers from Brooklyn
African-American male rappers
American rappers of Jamaican descent
American hip hop record producers
African-American record producers
21st-century American rappers
Record producers from New York (state)
21st-century American male musicians
21st-century African-American musicians
20th-century African-American people